The Lastres Formation is a geological formation located in Asturias province, northwestern Spain. It is believed to have been deposited in a fluvial-dominated deltaic system.

Fossil tracks have been reported from the formation, including those of dinosaurs, pterosaurs, crocodiles, turtles, and lizards.

Fossil content

Pterosaurs

Plants

Correlation

See also 
 List of fossil sites

References 

Geologic formations of Spain
Jurassic System of Europe
Jurassic Spain
Kimmeridgian Stage
Tithonian Stage
Sandstone formations
Conglomerate formations
Mudstone formations
Fluvial deposits
Deltaic deposits
Ichnofossiliferous formations
Paleontology in Spain
Formations